The 1893 European Figure Skating Championships were held from January 21 to 22 in Berlin, German Empire. Elite figure skaters competed for the title of European Champion in the category of men's singles. The competitors performed only compulsory figures.

The results of these Championships had been declared invalid by the ISU Congress in 1895.

Results

Men

Judges:
 C. Fillunger 
 E. Savor 
 L. von Stuller 
 H. Cederström 
 A. Keidel 
 H. Wendt 
 K. von Schlemmer

References

Sources
 Result list provided by the ISU

External links
 https://web.archive.org/web/20081204095425/http://www.eskatefans.com/skatabase/euromen1891.html

European Figure Skating Championships, 1893
European Figure Skating Championships
European 1893
European Figure Skating Championships, 1893
1893 in German sport
1890s in Berlin
January 1893 sports events
Sports competitions in Berlin